The UK Music Video Awards is an annual celebration of creativity, technical excellence and innovation in music video and moving image for music. The awards began in 2008. There is a wide range of opportunities for UK individuals and companies to enter their work: from genre-led video categories, to prizes for individuals in the technical and craft areas of the business, to recognition for innovative approaches to music videos, ads and other visuals. There are also awards for international videos and outstanding individuals, voted for by the MVA jury members. The Awards take place in the autumn, with the entry process opening in early August. The UK MVA’s are originally the key members of the team behind BUG, the BFI Southbank’s music video strand, and have 20 years’ experience running events in the UK music video business.

Ceremonies

Categories
As of 2021, 38 categories are awarded split in video genre (whick are divided in British, international and newcomer), special video, craft and technical and individual and company categories plus the Video of the Year and special categories like the Icon Award.

Current categories

References

External links 
 

British music awards
Music video awards